Richard Cuthbert Rudgard, OBE (28 December 1901 – 19 April 1985) was Archdeacon of Basingstoke from 1958  until his retirement in 1971.

The son of Canon Richard Wiliam Rudgard,  he was educated at Radley and St Augustine's College, Canterbury. He was ordained in 1934 after several years with the Melanesian Mission. He was  curate at Heene from 1934 to 1936 when he became Rector of Newbold Pacey with Moreton Morrell. When World War II began he became a Chaplain to the Forces, during which he was Mentioned in despatches thrice. In 1946 he became  Rector of Eversley and was Rural Dean of Odiham from 1953 to 1958. He was the Incumbent at Ellisfield from 1960 to 1974.

Notes

1901 births
People educated at Radley College
Alumni of St Augustine's College, Canterbury
Archdeacons of Basingstoke
1985 deaths
World War II chaplains
Officers of the Order of the British Empire
People from Ellisfield